Kharkiv Art Museum is one of the largest collections of fine and applied arts in Ukraine, a state museum.

History 
Kharkov Art Museum was founded in 1905 and was originally called the City Art and Industry Museum. The Kharkiv historian Dmytro Bahalii headed the commission for completing the new museum.

In 1907, at the personal request of Bahalii, Ilya Repin donated to the museum his portrait of General Mikhail Dragomirov.

In 1920 the museum was named the Church-Historical Museum. Its collection consisted of artworks from the Kharkiv and Volyn diocesan repositories and the collection of Kharkiv University.

In 1922 it was transformed into the Museum of Ukrainian Art and divided into 3 departments: painting, sculpture and architecture. In the painting department, samples of book graphics, a collection of icons of the 16th-19th centuries, as well as portrait, landscape and genre painting of the 18th-19th centuries were collected.

In the 1930s the museum was closed to the public.

In 1944 it was re-opened under the name of the Museum of Ukrainian Art; in 1949-1965 it was called the State Museum of Fine Arts, then the current name was adopted.

In 2022, the museum building was damaged during the Russian invasion. Due to the shelling, the facade of the building, windows and stained-glass windows were damaged.

Building 

The building of the Kharkov Art Museum is located at the address: , 11, Kharkov (Kiev region). It was built in 1912 according to the project of the outstanding Ukrainian architect, academician Alexei Beketov for the industrialist I. E. Ignatishchev, the owner of the Kharkiv Ivanovo brewery. The building is designed in a classical style with baroque elements. After the October Revolution and the establishment of Soviet power in Kharkov, in 1922–1928, the Council of People's Commissars (SNK) of Ukraine worked here, headed by the chairman of the Council of People's Commissars of the Ukrainian SSR Vlas Chubar. After the SNK moved in 1928, the former Ignatishchev Mansion housed the Taras Shevchenko Institute (now the National Taras Shevchenko Museum in Kyiv) in the building of Gosprom. In the post-war period, this building housed the Kharkov Art Museum.

Collection 
Currently, works of pre-revolutionary Russian and Ukrainian art, art of the Soviet period, Western European art and arts and crafts of the 16th-20th centuries are exhibited in 25 halls of the Kharkiv Art Museum. The collection includes works by prominent Russian painters Karl Bryullov, Ivan Aivazovsky, Ivan Shishkin, Vasily Surikov, Vladimir Borovikovsky, Dmitry Levitzky, Nikolai Yaroshenko, Victor Borisov-Musatov and others. The Kharkiv Art Museum also houses the largest collection of works by Ilya Repin in Ukraine - 11 paintings (among them the famous Reply of the Zaporozhian Cossacks, a version of 1889–1893, transferred to Kharkov Museum from the State Tretyakov Gallery in 1932) and 8 sheets of graphics. In addition, the museum has a rich collection of famous Ukrainian artists, including Taras Shevchenko, Serhii Vasylkivsky, Mykhaylo Berkos,  and others. The museum's collections include about 25 thousand items of painting, graphics, sculpture, decorative and applied arts, which are stored here.

References 

Art museums and galleries in Ukraine
Museums in Kharkiv
Articles with missing Wikidata information
Museums established in 1905